Tadeusz Stefan Zieliński ([Faddei Frantsevich] September 14, 1859 – May 8, 1944) was a prominent Polish classical philologist, historian, and translator of Sophocles, Euripides and other classical authors into Russian. His most well-known works are Die Gliederung der altattischen Komoedie, Tragodumenon libri tres, and Iresione, the last of which is a collection of essays.

Life and career
He was born on 14 September 1859 in Skrzypczyńce, Russian Empire (present-day Ukraine) to father Franciszek and mother Ludwika (née Grudzińska), both of them of Polish descent. Between 1869 and 1876 he attended secondary school in Saint Petersburg and subsequently in the years 1876–1881 he studied in Leipzig, Munich and Vienna. In 1880 he earned his doctorate from the University of Leipzig for his dissertation, Die Gliederung der altattischen Komoedie. He was author of works on the history of ancient Greek culture and religion, classical education, and popularization of classical studies (published largely in Russian and German).

In 1884 he became a professor at the University of St. Petersburg, and following Polish independence he held the chair of Classical Studies at Warsaw University for 17 years (1922–1939) during the interwar period. He was the recipient of honorary doctorates from the Jagiellonian University, Kraków (1930), and twelve western European universities. Between 1933 and 1939 Zieliński was a member of the prestigious Polish Academy of Literature.

His daughter became the wife of Prof. Vladimir Beneshevich, executed by the Soviet regime in 1938. Adrian Piotrovsky, his natural son, was arrested by the NKVD in November 1937 and executed.

After the outbreak of World War II, Zieliński left Poland to live with his son in Bavaria, where he lived until he died in 1944 after completing Religions of the Ancient World, which he considered to be his magnum opus.

Scholarly work
Although Zieliński was active in many areas of classical scholarship, one of the studies for which he is best known in the West is his investigation of the prose rhythm of Cicero, published in 1904, which is still often referred to today. (See Clausula (rhetoric)). He was also an early mentor to Mikhail Bakhtin. Zieliński's concept of pliaska, in which logocentricism is challenged by incorporating gesture and dance into speech, is referenced in Bakhtin's communication theories that emphasize group participation in the interpretation of meaning between self and other.

His work Tragodumena: De trimetri Euripidei evolutione is a primary reference work for chronology, style, and resolution within Euripides' individual plays as well as across Euripides' body of work, and employs an early narratological methodology.

Works
 Cicero im Wandel der Jahrhunderte. (Leipzig 1897, 2nd ed. 1908)
 Das Clauselgesetz in Ciceros Reden. Grundzüge einer oratorischen Rhythmik (1904)
 Der Constructive Rhythmus in Ciceros Reden. Der oratorischen Rhythmik zweiter Teil (1913)
 Rzym i jego religia (1920, Polish) 
 Chrześcijaństwo starożytne a filozofia rzymska (1921, Polish)
 Grecja. Budownictwo, plastyka, krajobraz (1923, Polish)
 Literatura starożytnej Grecji epoki niepodległości (1923, Polish)
 Rozwój moralności w świecie starożytnym od Homera do czasów Chrystusa (1927, Polish)
 Filheleńskie poematy Byrona (1928, Polish)
 Kleopatra (1929, Polish)
 
 
  OCLC-number for the translated edition:

References

Further reading

 
 Srebrny, Stefan (1947 (2013)) Tadeusz Zieliński (1859-1944). (English translation of Polish original; contains photograph.)
 R. Zaborowski, "Tadeusz Zieliński (1859-1944) - sa vie et son œuvre." In: Annales du Centre Scientifique à Paris de l’Académie Polonaise des Sciences 12, 2009, pp. 207–222.

1859 births
1944 deaths
People from Cherkasy Oblast
Polish classical philologists
Members of the Prussian Academy of Sciences
Polish classical scholars
Leipzig University alumni
Ludwig Maximilian University of Munich alumni
University of Vienna alumni
Academic staff of Saint Petersburg State University
Academic staff of the University of Warsaw
Members of the Polish Academy of Literature
Members of the Lwów Scientific Society
Corresponding members of the Saint Petersburg Academy of Sciences
Honorary members of the Saint Petersburg Academy of Sciences
Corresponding Fellows of the British Academy
Members of the Göttingen Academy of Sciences and Humanities